The 2001 Dublin senior football championship was won by Na Fianna. Na Fianna managed to retain the title having won it in 2000 by beating St. Brigid's at Parnell Park.

External links
 Official Dublin Website
 Dublin on Hoganstand
 Dublin Club GAA
 Reservoir Dubs
 Dublin Teams

Dublin Senior Football Championship
Dublin Senior Football Championship